Wolves is a 1930 British crime film directed by Albert de Courville and starring Charles Laughton, Dorothy Gish and Malcolm Keen. The screenplay concerns a woman who is captured by a gang of criminals operating in the Arctic, only for the leader to later help her escape. It was based on a play by Georges Toudouze. It was produced by Herbert Wilcox's British and Dominions Film Corporation, but filmed at the Blattner Studios whilst sound equipment was being installed at Wilcox's nearby Imperial Studios, and the sound was added after filming was completed. It was Gish's first sound film, and was Laughton's second talkie (but his first sound drama), having completed a film of a musical variety performance earlier the same year. Of 57 minutes original duration, it was released in 1936 in a 37-minute version retitled "Wanted Men".

Plot

Cast
 Charles Laughton ...  Captain Job
 Dorothy Gish ...  Leila McDonald
 Malcolm Keen ...  Pierre
 Jack Osterman ...  Hank
 Arthur Margetson ...  Mark
 Franklyn Bellamy ...  Pablo
 Griffith Humphreys ...  Semyon
 Andrews Engelmann ...  Pfeiffer
 Betty Bolton ...  Naroutcha

References

External links

1930 films
1930 crime films
Films directed by Albert de Courville
British black-and-white films
British and Dominions Studios films
British crime films
Films shot at Rock Studios
1930s English-language films
1930s British films